Francisco de Moncada (in Catalan: Francesc de Montcada i Montcada), 3rd Marquis of Aytona, (1586–1635) was a Spanish diplomat, soldier and writer of the early 17th century. He was also interim Governor of the Spanish Netherlands.

Early life
Moncada, Ambassador in Germany and Governor of the Spanish Netherlands (where he commissioned a seated and equestrian portrait from Anthony van Dyck), a general and commander of the Spanish-Flemish armies, and a brilliant medieval historian, was born in Valencia to Gastón de Moncada, 2nd Marquis of Aitona, (1554–1626), Ambassador to Rome Viceroy of Sardinia, 1590–1595, Viceroy of Aragon, 1603–1610, and his wife Catalina de Moncada (her maiden name) baroness of Callosa.  He was taught as a child of the great works of both chivalry and the troubadours, especially Joanot Martorell's Tirant lo Blanch which influenced Miguel de Cervantes so much that he praises it in Don Quixote.

Literary work
Moncada wrote Expedicion de Catalanes y Argoneses al Oriente about the Catalan Company.  This history gives an account of the followers of Roger de Flor in their cooperation and fighting the Byzantine Empire and later their capture of the Duchy of Athens. Editions:
(Barcelona, 1623; Madrid, 1777, 1805, 1883; around 97 pages, Paris, 1841, in "Tesoro de los historiadores espanoles").

Moncada also wrote Vida de Anicio Manlio Torquato Severino Boecio. This Roman politician from an illustrious imperial family of the 6th century, was known as Anicius Manlius Severinus Boëthius, commonly called Boethius. This work was not published until after Moncada's death, first going to press at Frankfurt, Germany in 1642.

Government service

Moncada served as the Spanish ambassador to the Holy Roman Emperor for some time. The Emperor Ferdinand II was very impressed by him.

He served as a counselor to Princess Isabella Clara Eugenia of Spain, regent of the Spanish Netherlands.  While serving in Brussels he tried to convince King Philip IV of Spain to transfer the general management of affairs in his Netherlands possessions to Brussels and remove any responsibility for such matters from the government in Madrid.  His proposals to give the various peoples in the Netherlands, still under Habsburg rule, more say in their governmental affairs were rejected.

He was made the commander-in-chief of the Spanish navy in the Netherlands in 1630. On 12–13 March 1631, his seamen under command of Count Jan VIII van Nassau-Siegen, were defeated at the Battle of the Slaak. In 1632 he was put in charge of all Spanish forces in the Netherlands. In 1634 he was made interim-governor of the Spanish Netherlands on the death of Spanish Netherlands Governess Isabella Clara Eugenia in December 1633.

He died in 1635 of a fever, caught at the successful siege of the Schenkenschanz near Goch, North Rhine-Westphalia, Germany, near the current Dutch-German border.

See also
Juan de Moncada
Battle of the Slaak

References
Introduction to Frances Hernandez' translation of Moncada's Catalan Chronicle.

External links

 
 
 
Text of Francisco's Catalan Chronicle (in Spanish) http://manybooks.net/titles/moncadad13511351613516-8.html

1586 births
1635 deaths
People from Valencia
Governors of the Habsburg Netherlands
Francisco 03
Writers from the Valencian Community
Spanish male writers